Aubyn Hill is a Jamaican politician from the Labour Party. He is a member of the Senate of Jamaica.

Political career 
He was appointed Minister of Industry, Investment and Commerce in the Cabinet of Jamaica in January 2022.

References 

Living people

Year of birth missing (living people)
21st-century Jamaican politicians

Members of the Senate of Jamaica
Jamaica Labour Party politicians
Harvard University alumni
Government ministers of Jamaica